St. Peter's Engineering College (SPEC) is an initiative of the Shanta Educational Institutions, Hyderabad, Telangana State, India. The institute was established in 2007, is approved by the AICTE New Delhi, and is affiliated with Jawaharlal Nehru Technological University, Hyderabad.

The institute has collaborations with foreign universities, student's exchange programs and direct intake into postgraduate is possible through this programme. The college started under the vision of chairman Shri T. Bala Reddy.

References

External links
 Official website

Engineering colleges in Hyderabad, India
All India Council for Technical Education
2007 establishments in Andhra Pradesh
Educational institutions established in 2007